The Fireball is a 1950 American drama film starring Mickey Rooney and Pat O'Brien, and directed by Tay Garnett. The cast also includes Beverly Tyler and the eighth screen appearance of Marilyn Monroe.

The film, released by 20th Century Fox, had its screenplay written by Horace McCoy based on a story by McCoy and Garnett.

Plot
Johnny Casar (Mickey Rooney) runs away from a home for wayward boys, tired of being teased about being short and a poor athlete. He soon finds a pair of roller skates and is befriended by Bruno Crystal (Ralph Dumke), who allows him to wash dishes at his café, while a priest who runs the home, Father O'Hara (Pat O'Brien), secretly keeps an eye on him.

A traveling roller-skating team takes an interest in Johnny after he shows some aptitude. He clashes with Mack Miller (Glen Corbett), a cocky champion, and falls for Mary Reeves (Beverly Tyler), another top skater. Johnny ends up featured in grudge matches against Miller, where they take turns one-upping one another.

As his fame grows, Johnny becomes every bit as arrogant as Miller and more. Life takes a bad turn when he is diagnosed with polio. A long period of physical therapy follows, until Johnny tries to get his life back on track.

Cast (in credits order)
 Mickey Rooney as Johnny Casar
 Pat O'Brien as Father O'Hara
 Beverly Tyler as Mary Reeves
 James Brown as Allen
 Ralph Dumke as Bruno Crystal
 Milburn Stone as Jeff Davis
 Bert Begley as Shilling
 Marilyn Monroe as Polly
 Sam Flint as Dr. Barton
 Glen Corbett as Mack Miller
 John Hedloe as Ullman

External links
 
 
 
 

1950 films
1950 drama films
20th Century Fox films
American black-and-white films
American drama films
1950s English-language films
Films directed by Tay Garnett
Films scored by Victor Young
Roller skating films
1950s American films